John Blue may refer to:

John Blue (ice hockey) (born 1966), American ice hockey player
John Rinehart Blue (1905–1965), American politician, educator and merchant
John S. Blue (1902–1942), US Naval officer
USS Blue (DD-744), US Navy ship named after John S. Blue
Johnny Blue, German singer and entrant in the Eurovision Song Contest
Johnny Blue (album), 1981 Thorleifs album

See also
Blue John (disambiguation)